Endre Botka (born 25 August 1994) is a Hungarian professional footballer who plays as a right-back for Ferencvárosi TC and the Hungary national team.

Club career
Botka was born in Budapest.

Ferencváros
In February 2020, he signed an undisclosed contract extension with Ferencvárosi TC.

On 16 June 2020, he became champion with Ferencváros by beating Budapest Honvéd FC at the Hidegkuti Nándor Stadion on the 30th match day of the 2019–20 Nemzeti Bajnokság I season.

On 29 September 2020, he was member of the Ferencváros team which qualified for the 2020–21 UEFA Champions League group stage after beating Molde FK on 3-3 aggregate (away goals) at the Groupama Aréna.

On 20 April 2021, he won the 2020-21 Nemzeti Bajnokság I season with Ferencváros by beating archrival Újpest FC 3-0 at the Groupama Arena. The goals were scored by Myrto Uzuni (3rd and 77th minute) and Tokmac Nguen (30th minute).

International career
He received his first call up to the senior Hungary squad for the UEFA Euro 2016 qualifiers against Romania and Northern Ireland in September 2015.

On 1 June 2021, Botka was included in the final 26-man squad to represent Hungary at the rescheduled UEFA Euro 2020 tournament.

Career statistics

International goals 

Scores and results list Hungary's goal tally first, score column indicates score after each Botka goal.

Honours

Honvéd
Nemzeti Bajnokság I: 2016–17

Ferencvárosi TC
 Nemzeti Bajnokság I: 2018–19, 2019–20, 2020–21, 2021–22
 Hungarian Cup: 2016–17, 2021–22

References

External links
MLSZ
 http://honvedfc.hu/jatekos-adatlap/50

1994 births
Living people
Footballers from Budapest
Hungarian footballers
Hungary international footballers
Association football defenders
Budapest Honvéd FC players
Kecskeméti TE players
Ferencvárosi TC footballers
Nemzeti Bajnokság I players
UEFA Euro 2020 players
Hungary youth international footballers
Hungary under-21 international footballers